The Manti Carnegie Library is a historic building in Manti, Utah. It was built in 1910-1911 as a Carnegie library, and designed in the Classical Revival style by Richard C. Watkins and John F. Birch. It has been listed on the National Register of Historic Places since October 25, 1984.

References

National Register of Historic Places in Sanpete County, Utah
Neoclassical architecture in Utah
Library buildings completed in 1910
Carnegie libraries in Utah
1910 establishments in Utah